Anthem is a 2022 studio album by American Celtic punk band Flogging Molly. It is their first studio album since 2017's Life Is Good.

Recording, release, and reception
The album is the first for the band on Rise Records and reunites them with Steve Albini, who recorded two albums of theirs almost 20 years prior. Edwin McFee of Hot Press reviewed the release, giving it a score of seven out of 10, noting that this album shows off the band's best qualities, without departing from their "tried and trusted style".

Track listing
"These Times Have Got Me Drinking" / "Tripping Up the Stairs" – 4:13
"A Song of Liberty" – 3:38
"Life Begins and Ends (But Never Fails)" – 3:17
"No Last Goodbyes" – 3:30
"The Croppy Boy '98" – 3:10
"This Road of Mine" – 3:18
"(Try) Keep the Man Down" – 2:55
"Now Is the Time" – 4:00
"Lead the Way" – 3:45
"These Are the Days" – 4:19
"The Parting Wave" – 3:16

Personnel

Flogging Molly
Mike Alonso – drums, percussion, spoons
Dennis Casey – electric guitar, acoustic guitar, banjo, backing vocals
Matt Hensley – accordion, backing vocals
Dave King – vocals, acoustic guitar, bodhrán, backing vocals
Nathen Maxwell – bass guitar, backing vocals
Bridget Regan – fiddle, tin whistle, bagpipes, vocals
Spencer Swain – banjo, mandolin, backing vocals

Technical personnel
Steve Albini – recording, production
Adam Greenspan – mixing
Kevin Moore – design, layout
Ryan Rawtone – cover

Charts

See also
List of 2022 albums

References

External links

Review at CrypticRock
Review from Distorted Sound
Review from Glide Magazine
Review from TopShelf Music

2022 albums
Flogging Molly albums
Rise Records albums
Albums produced by Steve Albini